Paul of Kolomna (Павел Коломенский) was a 17th-century Russian prelate and martyr in the view of the Old Believers.

The son of a rural clergyman, he was born in the village of Kolychevo, Nizhny Novgorod Oblast. He entered monastic orders at Makaryev Monastery, and became treasurer there. He became Bishop of Kolomna on October 17, 1652.

An opponent of the reforms of Patriarch Nikon, he was stripped of his bishopric in 1654. He was banished to Paleostrovsky monastery, on an island in Lake Onega, moving to Khutyn Monastery in 1656. He was killed on April 16, 1656. He is regarded as a martyr by the Old Believers.

Year of birth unknown
1656 deaths
People from Lyskovsky District
Old Believers
17th-century Eastern Orthodox bishops
Bishops of the Russian Orthodox Church
17th-century Eastern Orthodox martyrs